(Land's End) is a Japanese professional wrestling promotion established in 2016 by Ryoji Sai.

History 
In January 2016, Ryoji Sai left Pro Wrestling Zero1 to launch a new promotion named Land's End. The promotion held its first event on March 31.

On December 15, 2017, the Pro Wrestling Land's End promotion announced that it had gotten the blessing of Pacific Wrestling Federation chairman Dory Funk Jr. and Mitsuo Momota, the son of inaugural champion Rikidōzan, to revive the All Asia Heavyweight Championship with a tournament to crown the new champion set to take place in South Korea on January 21, 2018. This also led to a new name and a new design of the championship. The tournament was won by Ryoji Sai who defeated Bodyguard in the finals of an eight-man tournament.

Roster

Staff

Championships

See also 

 Professional wrestling in Japan
 List of professional wrestling promotions in Japan

References

External links 

Japanese professional wrestling promotions
2016 establishments in Japan
Entertainment companies established in 2016
Companies based in Yokohama